"Hi Bich" is a song recorded by rapper Bhad Bhabie. It was released on September 22, 2017 as the lead single from her debut mixtape 15, and it peaked at number 68 on the Billboard Hot 100 on October 21, 2017. The single went gold on March 28, 2018, and platinum on October 20, 2020. It was ranked 101st on The Faders "101 Best Songs of 2017".

Music video
The official music video, which was directed by Iqbal Ahmed was posted to Bhabie's YouTube channel on September 21, 2017. In the music video, Bhabie is shown as the defendant in a court case. Chaos breaks out in the court room, and in the next scene she is shown strapped into an electric chair and appears to be electrocuted. In the following scene, Bhabie is seen in a wedding dress in the back of a white Porsche being pulled by a white stallion. The video appears in the same upload as the music video for her next single, "Whachu Know". As of November 7, 2021, the video has 214 million views on YouTube.

Remix
On February 1, 2018, a remix of Hi Bich was posted to WorldStarHipHop's official YouTube channel. The remix featured Rich the Kid, YBN Nahmir, and Asian Doll. The music video was originally intended to feature Nahmir, but he was removed from the video before its initial release due to a scheduling conflict and replaced with rapper MadeinTYO.

Charts

Certifications

References

External links 
2017 singles
2017 songs
Bhad Bhabie songs
Songs written by Bhad Bhabie
Song recordings produced by Ronny J
Songs written by Ronny J